Noeeta crepidis is a species of tephritid or fruit flies in the genus Noeeta of the family Tephritidae.

Distribution
Germany, Austria, Hungary, Ukraine, Southwest Russia.

References

Tephritinae
Insects described in 1936
Diptera of Europe